The 1996 Idaho Vandals football team represented the University of Idaho in the 1996 NCAA Division I-A football season. The Vandals, led by second-year head coach Chris Tormey, were members of the Big West Conference and played their home games at the Kibbie Dome, an indoor facility on campus in Moscow, Idaho. Idaho was 6–5 overall and 3–2 in conference play.

Idaho's home winning streak in the Kibbie Dome extended to seventeen games this season, winning all five home games, but they had only one road victory. That was over rival Boise State in the season finale in Boise, the fourteenth win over the Broncos in the last 

With the move up to Division I-A this season, Idaho changed its uniforms' shade of gold from yellow

Schedule

Roster

NFL Draft
One Vandal senior was selected in the 1997 NFL Draft, which lasted seven rounds (240 selections).

List of Idaho Vandals in the NFL Draft

References

External links
Gem of the Mountains: 1997 University of Idaho yearbook – 1996 football season
Idaho Argonaut – student newspaper – 1996 editions

Idaho
Idaho Vandals football seasons
Idaho Vandals football